Echo of Small Things (2005) is an album by the American ambient musician Robert Rich. The inspiration for this album comes from mundane everyday experiences that culture usually overlooks. The slow droning music on this album weaves through recordings of footsteps, casual voices and other ordinary sounds.

This album is a collaboration with photographer David Agasi. It is available in a limited edition of 129 copies that come with a set of ten prints of Agasi’s photographs. Standard editions feature smaller representations of these photographs inside the booklet.

Track listing
”Pathways” – 9:36
”Fences” – 4:57
”Circle Unwound” – 9:00
”Passing Terrain” – 6:09
”Glint in Her Eyes” – 6:25
”Scent of Night Jasmine” – 9:09
”Summer Thunder” – 4:27
”Hollow Rings Longer” – 5:19
”Weightless Morning” – 6:12

External links
Album details from Robert Rich’s official web site

Robert Rich (musician) albums
2005 albums